Oreothlypis is a genus of New World warbler. Most members of this genus for formerly classified in the genus Vermivora. However, the species then in Vermivora were more closely related to the flame-throated warbler and crescent-chested warbler, then classed in Parula, than to other species of Vermivora. Initially, the new genus Leiothlypis was proposed for these species by Sangster in 2008, but the American Ornithologists' Union opted to classify them along with the flame-throated and crescent-chested warblers in the existing genus Oreothlypis, though accepted the change in 2019.

Species

References

 
Bird genera
Parulidae
Taxa named by Robert Ridgway